Jefferson Gottardi (13 January 1976 — 4 September 2003) was a Bolivian footballer.

Career

Club
Born in Santa Cruz de la Sierra, Gottardi began his career in his native Bolivia, attending the prestigious Tahuichi Academy (which also produced Marco Etcheverry and Jaime Moreno), and playing for Oriente Petrolero and Bolívar in the Liga de Fútbol Profesional Boliviano. 

He secured a loan move to the United States in 1999 to play for Tampa Bay Mutiny, and scored two goals on his MLS debut in a 5-2 loss to D.C. United, but never truly settled in Major League Soccer. He was waived by the team in August 1999, having played just 11 games, scoring 4 goals.

After leaving Tampa, Gottardi went on loan at Deportivo Táchira in Venezuela, and then moved to Goiás in Brazil, his final club.

International
Gottardi was a member of the Bolivia national team, having competed in the qualifying tournament for the 1996 Atlanta Olympics, and in qualifying for the Copa América 1999 in Paraguay. In the end he only earned one senior cap, a friendly match against the United States.

Personal life
His father, Toninho Gottardi, was a Brazilian who managed Oriente Petrolero.

Health problems and death
While playing for Goiás in the Campeonato Brasileiro Série A, Gottardi began to suffer from "unusual problems with his heart", and was forced to retire from competitive play. He travelled to Cuba for treatment, to which he initially responded well, but was eventually diagnosed with ALS in July 2002. He suffered a heart attack on September 4, 2003, and died at the Virgen de la Asunción hospital in La Paz. He was 27 and was survived by his Brazilian wife Veruschka Vanderley and their 4-year old daughter.

See also
 List of foreign MLS players

References

External links

1979 births
2003 deaths
Sportspeople from Santa Cruz de la Sierra
Bolivian footballers
Bolivia international footballers
Oriente Petrolero players
Club Bolívar players
Tampa Bay Mutiny players
Deportivo Táchira F.C. players
Goiás Esporte Clube players
Bolivian expatriate footballers
Expatriate soccer players in the United States
Expatriate footballers in Venezuela
Expatriate footballers in Brazil
Major League Soccer players
Neurological disease deaths in Bolivia
Deaths from motor neuron disease
Association football forwards